Barney is an unincorporated community in Faulkner County, Arkansas, United States.

The Blessing Farmstead, which is listed on the National Register of Historic Places, is near the community.

References

Unincorporated communities in Faulkner County, Arkansas
Unincorporated communities in Arkansas